Jasbir K. Puar (born 1967) is a U.S.-based philosopher and queer theorist. She is a professor and graduate director of women's studies and gender studies at Rutgers University, where she has been a faculty member since 2000. Her most recent book is The Right to Maim: Debility, Capacity, Disability (2017). Puar is the author of award-winning Terrorist Assemblages: Homonationalism in Queer Times (2007), which has been translated into Spanish and French and re-issued in an expanded version for its 10th anniversary (December 2017). She has written widely on South Asian diasporic cultural production in the United States, United Kingdom and Trinidad, LGBT tourism, terrorism studies, surveillance studies, biopolitics and necropolitics, disability and debilitation, theories of intersectionality, affect, and assemblage; animal studies and posthumanism, homonationalism, pinkwashing, and the Palestinian territories.

Academic career
Raised in the Basking Ridge section of Bernards Township, New Jersey, Puar graduated in 1985 from Ridge High School. She has an M.A. in Women's Studies from the University of York and completed her Ph.D. in Ethnic Studies at University of California at Berkeley in 1999.

In "Queer Times, Queer Assemblages", published in 2005, Puar analyzes the War on Terror as an assemblage of racism, nationalism, patriotism, and terrorism, suggesting that it is "already profoundly queer". Her focus is on terrorist corporealities in opposition to "normative patriot bodies", and she argues that "discourses of counterterrorism are intrinsically gendered, raced, sexualized, and nationalized".

Puar draws from the "assemblage" approach developed by Gilles Deleuze and Félix Guattari. This is a way of viewing social and political phenomena as a combination of biological and cultural factors. She critiques the deployment of homonationalism in the United States as a justification to violently implement the doctrine of American exceptionalism embodied in the War on Terror. The United States flaunts its supposedly liberal openness to homosexuality to secure its identity in contradistinction to sexual oppression in Muslim countries. This oppression serves as an excuse for the United States to "liberate" oppressed women and sexual deviants in these countries, simultaneously papering over sexual inequality in the United States. United States exceptionalism and homonationalism are mutually constitutive, blending discourses of American Manifest Destiny, racist foreign policy, and an urge to document the unknown (embodied in the terrorist) and conquer it through queering its identity, hence rendering it manageable and knowable.

Puar's Terrorist Assemblages: Homonationalism in Queer Times, published in October 2007, describes connections between contemporary "gay rights" discourse, the integration of gay people into consumerism, the ascendance of "whiteness", and Western imperialism and the war on terrorism. Puar argues that traditional heteronormative ideologies now find accompaniment from "homonormative" ideologies replicating the same hierarchical ideals concerning maintenance of dominance in terms related to race, class, gender, and nation-state, a set of ideologies she deems "homonationalism". Some reviewers have associated this argument with the "queer Marxism" of Kevin Floyd.

Works
 Terrorist Assemblages: Homonationalism in Queer Times (2007), Durham: Duke University Press, ; 10th Anniversary Edition (2017) Durham: Duke University Press ; translated into French as: Homonationalisme. Politiques queers après le 11 Septembre'' (2012), Judy Minx (translator,), Paris: Editions Amsterdam, Maxime Cervulle, 
"The Right to Maim: Debility, Capacity, Disability", (2017), Duke University Press.

References

Further reading
 

1967 births
Alumni of the University of York
Living people
People from Bernards Township, New Jersey
Queer theorists
Ridge High School alumni
Rutgers University faculty
University of California, Berkeley alumni